Dekov may refer to:

 Děkov, a village in the Czech Republic
 , a village in Belene Municipality, Bulgaria